Siberian Light Aviation Flight 51 was a passenger flight on September 12, 2021, by a Let L-410 Turbolet plane, from Irkutsk north to Kazatjinskoje, Irkutsk Oblast, Siberia, near Lake Baikal. The plane crashed about 4 kilometers (2.5 miles) from the airport. The cause is under investigation by the Interstate Aviation Committee (IAC or MAK), the Russian Accident Commission.

The flight was operated on behalf of Aeroservice LLC.

Background 
The aircraft, a Let L-410 Turbolet model UVP-E20, was manufactured and commissioned in 2014. The Let-410 is built by Czech aerospace manufacturer Let Kunovice. 

The airline Siberian Light Aviation, also known by the name of Sila Avia, was founded in January 2017 and flies short-haul flights in Siberia and areas just southwest of Siberia such as Omsk, Tiumen, Yekaterinburg, Chelyabinsk and Nizhny Tagil. Their headquarters is in Magadan. At the time of the accident, there were eight L-410 aircraft and three Antonov An-28 aircraft in their fleet. 

After a previously spotless safety record, Flight 51 was the airline's second serious incident in 2021. On July 17, Siberian Light Aviation Flight 42, an Antonov-28 with 2 pilots and 15 passengers, suffered a dual engine failure and crash landed in a remote area in the Vasyugan Swamp in southwestern Siberia.   In that accident, all of the occupants survived the accident with one crew member requiring surgery.

Crew 
The captain of Siberian Light Aviation Flight 51 had just over 5,600 flight hours at the time of the accident, including 483 hours as captain.

Accident 
After an earlier failed landing attempt at 10:35 p.m., the accident occurred at about 11:15 p.m. local time during the crew's second attempt to land the plane.

Rescuers were quickly on the scene and initially managed to rescue everyone on board. According to the region's governor, Igor Kobzev, five people were able to leave the wreckage on their own while the others had to be helped or carried out. Four people died from their injuries within 24 hours of the accident. Of the 16 people on board, 12 survived. Three passengers and the co-pilot were killed.

Investigation 
MAK, the Russian Accident Commission, launched an investigation into the accident on the same day. 

The investigation has shown that visibility was no more than 500 metres either at the time of the plane's first failed landing attempt or at the time of the accident. 

Kazatjinskoje Airport lacked sophisticated radar systems and the ability for aircraft to make instrumental landings (ILS). In the aftermath of the crash, Rosaviatsia, Russia's regulatory committee on civil aviation, has proposed an investigation and the possibility of banning night landings in Kazatjinskoje and other airfields in Russia in the future, where visual landings are the only possibility and facilities for instrument landings are missing. 

While the media speculates about pilot mistakes in flight in bad weather, the surviving captain has said in interviews after the accident that important navigational instruments were out of order and that played a role in the accident.

External links 
 Interstate Aviation Committee investigation pages: English version and Russian version
 Aerial view of the crash site (video)

References

2021 disasters in Russia
Accidents and incidents involving the Let L-410 Turbolet
Aviation accidents and incidents in 2021
Aviation accidents and incidents in Russia
September 2021 events in Russia